Tsaratanana may refer to several places in Madagascar:
 Tsaratanana in Tsaratanana District, Betsiboka Region.
 Tsaratanana District in Betsiboka Region.
 Tsaratanana in Boriziny District, Sofia Region.
 Tsaratanana in Mandritsara District, Sofia Region.
 Tsaratanana in Ifanadiana District, Vatovavy.
 Tsaratanana, a village that is part of Vinaninkarena municipality, near Antsirabe

Natural reserves
 Tsaratanana Reserve - a natural reserve and mountain in Diana Region.

Airports
Tsaratanana Airport - the airport of Tsaratanana, Betsiboka

Animals
Tsaratanana chameleon - a chameleon